Kidatu Dam, also Kidadu Hydroelectric Power Station, is a  hydroelectric dam in Tanzania.

Location
The coordinates of Kidatu Power Station are:7°39'47.0"S, 36°58'39.0"E (Latitude:-7.663056; Longitude:36.977500).

Overview 
The Kidatu power plant was built in two phases under the name of Great Ruaha Power Project in the 1970s for phase one and 1980s for phase two. Phase I was completed in 1975 starting with the construction of an earth-rock fill dam, a generating capacity of 2 x 51 MW, and 220 kV transmission line to Dar es Salaam via Morogoro.

The plant has undergone two major rehabilitation works. Phase I covered repairs to turbines one and two, replacement of excitation equipment and repair of a damaged generator unit. These works were executed from 1993 to 1994.  The second rehabilitation commenced in 1999. Major works were computerizing the control and protection system, repair to turbines, replacement of runners on units 1 and 2, generators and water ways. The project was financed by SIDA, NORAD and Tanesco at the estimated cost of about US$12 million.

In 2017, repairs were carried out on one of the 51 megawatts units which had failed. The work was carried out by engineers and technicians from the Croatian manufactures of the turbines, and personnel from Tanesco, the national electricity generation monopoly. The next major maintenance on the power station, is planned for 2020.

See also 

 List of power stations in Tanzania

References

Sources 
Öhman, May-Britt, Taming Exotic Beauties: Swedish Hydro Power Constructions in Tanzania in the Era of Development Assistance, 1960s - 1990s, Stockholm, 2007, PhD Thesis, http://www.diva-portal.org/smash/record.jsf?pid=diva2:12267

External links 
 Official Website of Tanesco 

Dams completed in 1975
Energy infrastructure completed in 1975
Dams completed in 1980
Energy infrastructure completed in 1980
Dams in Tanzania
Hydroelectric power stations in Tanzania